Domenico Ammirato (1833–1883) was an Italian painter, mainly of seascapes in his native Naples.

He trained at the Neapolitan Institute of Fine Arts, following the example of Gabriele Smargiassi. He became professor of painting at the International Institute of Naples.  Among his works are:
Un chiaro dì luna a Posillipo
La marina piccola di Sorrento
Sorrento da Capodimonte
Veduta di Bagnolo
Veduta di Posillipo

References

1833 births
1883 deaths
19th-century Neapolitan people
19th-century Italian painters
Italian male painters
Painters from Naples
19th-century Italian male artists